Moosomin is a town in southern Saskatchewan founded in 1882. It is 20 kilometres west of the provincial boundary between Saskatchewan and Manitoba.

History 
With the arrival of the Canadian Pacific Railway in 1882, Moosomin was established as the first Saskatchewan community on "steel". Originally known as "siding No. 4" and the "Moosomin Station", businesses began to establish and by 1884 the community had grown to include five general stores, five hotels, two livery stables, two blacksmiths, a doctor, a lawyer, butcher, and one printer, among other businesses. Moosomin was incorporated as a town in November 1887. R. D. McNaughton was the first merchant to arrive in Moosomin. He founded the R. D. McNaughton Company, a general store operation that played a vital role in early settlement.

The town was named after Chief  Moosomin, who became well known for leading his band into treaty status. He signed Treaty 6 at Battleford in 1880.

The first issue of the Moosomin Courier weekly newspaper was published on Thursday, October 2, 1884. The newspaper has been published weekly since 1884 and is now known as the World-Spectator. It is the oldest community newspaper in the province.

Moosomin had several military units that were associated with the community. These included the 16th Light Horse, in the early 1900s (decade); 10th Regiment, Canadian Mounted Rifles, 1915; 217th Battalion, CEF, and the 101st Battery of the 22nd Field Regiment which was based at Moosomin Armories (presently the Community Hall).

Moosomin also had a jail, the Moosomin Gaol, which is located at the site of the present day Turpie Farm. In 1905, a hospital opened, and it was the only hospital between Brandon and Indian Head. A normal school was opened.

One of Moosomin's more notables is General Andrew McNaughton, born in Moosomin in 1887. In the Second World War, he commanded Canada's overseas army and then became Minister of Defence. In the interwar years he was Chairman of the National Research Council and following the Second World War was Chairman of the International Joint Commission which handled questions pertaining to the international waters along the Canada-United States border.

The social life of the early settlers of the area was limited by distances and transportation methods. Sunday church services were often held in private homes.  The small one room school houses became the centre of activity in most areas. Saturday nights were often the social night of the week, when groceries and supplies were purchased. There was often entertainment in the Opera House in the R.D. McNaughton Store. Summer picnics were held in the period between summerfallowing and haying. July 1 in Moosomin was the highlight of the summer for many years, there would be a parade, sports events and refreshments. With the arrival of the automobile, social life changed accordingly.

Current development 
Moosomin grew significantly in the late 1960s and early 1970s with the construction of a major potash mine  to the north. Moosomin is currently undergoing significant growth. According to Saskatchewan Health, which tracks population based on the number of health cards issued, there were 2,733 people living in Moosomin on June 30, 2010, up from 2,496 a year earlier, an increase of 227 people. The growth is due to several reasons. The PotashCorp Rocanville potash mine just north of the community is undergoing a $2.8 billion expansion, the $60 million Red Lily Wind Farm just west of the community started producing power in February 2011, since the Trans-Canada Highway was twinned through Moosomin in November 2009 several new businesses have been established along the highway, the Southeast Integrated Care Centre has become a major health care centre for a large region of south-eastern Saskatchewan and south-western Manitoba, and there has been significant activity in the local oil patch, which is at the northern end of the Bakken Formation.

Several major projects are on the drawing board in Moosomin. Land has been purchased for two major hotel developments next to the Canalta Hotel, which opened in 2010 facing the new highway, and land has been purchased for Pipestone Villas, a major residential development. Fourteen kilometres south of Moosomin is Moosomin Lake and Moosomin Lake Regional Park.

Demographics 

Climate

Moosomin in popular culture 
 The Guess Who song "Runnin' Back to Saskatoon" mentions Moosomin.

Notable residents 
 Jessica Campbell (born 1992), ice hockey player
 Brock Lesnar (born 1977), professional wrestler and mixed martial artist
 Andrew McNaughton (1887–1966), former Chief of the General Staff of the Canadian Army
 John Ryerson Neff, politician
 Frederick Ralph Sharp (1915–1992), former Chief of the Defence Staff of the Canadian Forces
 Dave Tippett (born 1961), ice hockey player and coach

See also 
 List of population centres in Saskatchewan
 List of communities in Saskatchewan
List of place names in Canada of Indigenous origin
 List of towns in Saskatchewan

References

External links 

Towns in Saskatchewan
Moosomin No. 121, Saskatchewan
Division No. 5, Saskatchewan
1882 establishments in Canada